HDR may refer to:

Science and technology
 Hard disk recorder, for digital audio or video
 HD Radio, digital audio broadcasting system
 High Data Rate, the previous name of Evolution-Data Optimized, a wireless telecommunications standard
 High Data Rate, a data rate defined in the InfiniBand communications standard
 High dynamic range, in audio or video
High-dynamic-range rendering, in computer graphics
 High-dynamic-range imaging, in digital photography
 High-dynamic-range video, in video 
 Homology directed repair, a DNA repair system in cells
 Hot dry rock, a form of geothermal energy production
 GATA3, a protein also named HDR

Organizations
 HDR, Inc., an American architectural and engineering firm
 HevyDevy Records, a Canadian record label
 High Dive Records, an American record label
 Honicknowle Defence Regiment, a criminal organization from Honicknowle, Plymouth, England

Places
 Hyderabad Junction railway station (station code), in Sindh, Pakistan
 Hadrian Road Metro station (station code), in England

Other uses
 Habilitation à diriger des recherches (accreditation to supervise research), an academic qualification in France
 Human Development Report, an annual United Nations publication
 Humanitarian daily ration, an air-dropped ration for disasters

See also

 Header (disambiguation)
 
 HDRS